The Nocturnes, Op. 55 are a set of two nocturnes for solo piano written by Frédéric Chopin. They are his fifteenth and sixteenth installations in the genre, and were composed between 1842 and 1844, and published in August 1844. Chopin dedicated them to his pupil and admirer Mademoiselle Jane Stirling.

Nocturne in F minor, Op. 55, No. 1

Composed in 1842–1844, the F minor nocturne has an average duration of about 5 minutes.

Structure
The piece is in ternary form (ABA). Its main theme has a slow  with a heavy, steady crotchet beat. It starts with the main theme which repeats once with only minor variations. The right hand plays a slow melody and the left hand accompanies with a bass note and then a chord, in crotchets. The second section is then played with, again, the right hand playing the melody and the left hand accompanying with bass notes and a chord. Although there are occasional changes to this pattern, for example the left hand plays a sustained minim with a crotchet chord above. The main theme then comes back in with some variations to the first two times it was played: a triplet phrase is added to the third bar of the section. The second section is again repeated with no variations, followed immediately by the first section again with the triplet sequence.

A tempo change to più mosso speeds up the piece. It starts off with some fast, triplet quavers and then three loud (forte) chords. This then repeats three further times until a completely new section comes in with a melody in the right hand and triplet broken chords in the left (see score on left). A descending scale and some large chords completes this section and leads it onto the first theme again.

There is then a large variation on the first theme where the main tune is played with other notes in between. There is then a large section of arpeggios and finishing off on six final chords, then modulates to the parallel key of F major for an interrupted final cadence.

There are two short chorales. The first, at bars 71–72, marks the transition from B section back to A, while the second, at 98–101, concludes the piece, in F major.

The piece was described by Frederick Niecks (Chopin's biographer) as: "we will note only the flebile [feeble] dolcezza of the first and the last section, and the inferiority of the more impassioned middle section".

Notable performances 

This piece was performed by Vladimir Horowitz in his television debut concert at Carnegie Hall in 1968, which was broadcast nationwide by CBS.

Nocturne in E-flat major, Op. 55, No. 2

The second nocturne in E major features a  time signature, triplet quavers in the bass, and a lento sostenuto tempo marking. The left-hand features sweeping legato arpeggios from the bass to the tenor, while the right-hand often plays a contrapuntal duet and a soaring single melody. There is a considerable amount of ornamentation in the right hand, for instance the prolonged trills in measures 34 and 52–54. The characteristic chromatic ornaments, in measures 7, 25, 36, and 50, often subdivide the beats in a syncopated fashion in contrast with the steady triplets in the left hand.

Of this nocturne, Niecks wrote:

In theatre 
The second and third duets of the ballet In the Night by Jerome Robbins (1970) were choreographed to this music.

In popular culture
 The F minor nocturne is featured in the 1997 action thriller The Peacemaker (starring George Clooney and Nicole Kidman), where the main terrorist character (Marcel Iureş as Dusan Gavrich), being a music teacher, explains to a young girl how to properly 'feel' and interpret the nuances in the music, and then plays it for her on the piano. The piece starts out as a solo piano performance and then expands into a full orchestral arrangement.
The song "For the Damaged Coda" by Blonde Redhead is based on the F minor nocturne, and appears in the animated series Rick and Morty.
The Witcher 2: Assassins of Kings Hope trailer has Nocturnes, Op. 55 playing in the background.
Cyberpunk 2077's last mission is titled Nocturne Op55N1 and is played by Hanako Arasaka at the beginning.

References

Sources
 David Heyer pp51–71 "An Analysis of the Chorales in Three Chopin Nocturnes: Op. 32, No.2; Op. 55, No.1; and the Nocturne in C# Minor (without opus number)". Masters thesis, University of Oregon, 2008-03.

External links
 
 Nocturnes, Op.55 at Musopen

55
1844 compositions
Compositions in F minor
Compositions in E-flat major
Music with dedications

ja:夜想曲第15番 (ショパン)